Sacred Heart School is a Roman Catholic elementary school in Norfolk County, Ontario, Canada. Courses there are taught with English as the primary language, with French language classes taught to students in grade 1 through 8. Learning about the Roman Catholic faith is mandatory.

References

External links
Sacred Heart School

Elementary schools in Norfolk County, Ontario
Catholic elementary schools in Ontario